"Private Dancer" is the second single by R&B singer Danny Fernandes. It was written by Belly, Danny Fernandes, and David Evering. It is also the second track off his debut album Intro.

Music video
The music video has Danny Fernandes singing in a club. He said it was about a Toronto Dance club and about the girls. Belly is currently singing at the very end with him. The music video shot at #1 on the MuchMusic Countdown. It also won the Best Pop Video of the Year award at the 2009 MuchMusic Video Awards.

Chart performance
The song debuted at number 81 on the Canadian Hot 100 and went on to peak at number 32, staying there for two weeks. It stayed on the chart for a total of twenty weeks.

Certification

References

External links
 

2008 singles
2008 songs
Danny Fernandes songs
Belly (rapper) songs
CP Music Group singles
Songs written by Belly (rapper)
Songs written by DaHeala